In the Gleneagles Agreement, in 1977, Commonwealth presidents and prime ministers agreed, as part of their support for the international campaign against apartheid, to discourage contact and competition between their sportsmen and sporting organisations, teams, or individuals from South Africa. The agreement was unanimously approved by the Commonwealth of Nations at a meeting at Gleneagles, Perthshire, Scotland.

The Gleneagles Agreement reinforced their commitment, embodied in the Singapore Declaration of Commonwealth Principles (1971), to oppose racism. This commitment was further strengthened by the Declaration on Racism and Racial Prejudice, adopted by Commonwealth leaders in Lusaka in 1979. The Commonwealth was a relevant body to impose a sporting ban on South Africa because several of the sports most popular among white South Africans are dominated by Commonwealth member states, for example cricket and rugby union.

See also 
 Sporting boycott of South Africa during the apartheid era
 Rugby union and apartheid
 1981 Springbok Tour
 South African rebel tours
 Halt All Racist Tours
 South Africa national rugby union team
 South Africa cricket team

References

External links

International opposition to apartheid in South Africa
History of the Commonwealth of Nations
History of Perth and Kinross
Commonwealth sports competitions
Events associated with apartheid
Politics and sports
1977 in politics
1977 in sports
1977 in Scotland
1977 in international relations
South Africa–United Kingdom relations
Rugby union and apartheid